Mauro Gandolfi (18 September 1764 – 4 January 1834) was an Italian painter and engraver of the Bolognese School.

Personal
Gandolfi was from a family of artists. His father was the painter Gaetano Gandolfi, and he had six younger brothers, all painters. He enrolled at age 16 in the French army. In 1791, he was then a student of the Academy of Fine Arts, Bologna and became a collaborator of his father. In 1792 he married Laura Zanetti.

Work
Gandolfi was promoted to professor at the Academy in 1794. After the turn of the century he switched to engraving. In 1801, he moved to Paris to specialize as an engraver, and created reproductions by engraving the works of French museums. After returning to Italy, he worked as an engraver in Bologna. In 1816, he traveled to New York City and Philadelphia, where he published illustrations of the places he visited. In 1833, he wrote his autobiography in which he lists his works from the period he described as his most prolific: between 1786 and 1796. He died in Bologna in 1834. At the time of his death, he had created over 80 works of art.

References

 Les Gandolfi, Bologna route (Italian)
 Mimi Cazort : Mauro in America, An Italian Artist Visits the New World, traduction de Antonia Reiner Franklin avec Mimi Cazort 

1764 births
1834 deaths
Baroque painters
Painters from Bologna
18th-century Italian painters
Italian male painters
19th-century Italian painters
19th-century Italian male artists
Italian engravers
Accademia di Belle Arti di Bologna alumni
18th-century Italian male artists